See also 1996 in birding and ornithology, main events of 1997 and 1998 in birding and ornithology

Worldwide

New species
See also Bird species new to science described in the 1990s 
 The jocotoco antpitta (Grallaria ridgelyi) from Ecuador was discovered in the Cerro Tapichalaca cloud forest.

Taxonomic developments
To be completed

Europe

Britain

Breeding birds
 Only eleven booming bitterns are heard, half as many as the previous year.
 Thousands of young black-legged kittiwakes and other seabirds die in north-east England during storms.
 A pair of red-backed shrikes breed in Northern Scotland.

Migrant and wintering birds
To be completed

Rare birds
 A spectacled warbler at Landguard Point, Suffolk is the second British record
 A semipalmated plover at Dawlish Warren National Nature Reserve in June is the second British record
 A male Siberian rubythroat in Dorset in October is the second British record
 A blue-cheeked bee-eater in Shetland in June and July is Britain's eighth, but only the second to be seen by large numbers of observers.
 A western sandpiper in Lothian in July is also Britain's eighth, but only the first to be seen by large numbers of observers.
 A record influx of sixteen desert wheatears occurs between October and December

Other events
 The British Birdwatching Fair has Ecuador as its theme for the year.

Scandinavia
To be completed

North America
To be completed

Asia
To be completed

References

Birding and ornithology
Birding and ornithology by year
Ornithology